The Hippard House (also called Martha's Hideaway) is a historic site in American Beach, Florida. It is located at 5406 Ervin Street. On October 12, 2001, it was added to the U.S. National Register of Historic Places.

References

 Nassau County listings at National Register of Historic Places

External links
 

Houses on the National Register of Historic Places in Florida
Houses in Nassau County, Florida
National Register of Historic Places in Nassau County, Florida
Houses completed in 1938
Colonial Revival architecture in Florida
Amelia Island